John Stevenson (1835–1908) was a member of the Wisconsin State Assembly.

Biography
Stevenson was born on April 11, 1835 near what is now Montreal, Quebec. During the American Civil War, he served with the 43rd Wisconsin Volunteer Infantry Regiment of the Union Army. Events he took part in include the Battle of Johnsonville.

Political career
Stevenson was a member of the Assembly during the 1876 and 1889 sessions. Additionally, he was Chairman (similar to Mayor) of Harmony, Vernon County, Wisconsin and in 1875 was a delegate to the State Republican Convention.

Stevenson died in Springville, Wisconsin on May 18, 1908.

References

1835 births
1908 deaths
Pre-Confederation Quebec people
People from Vernon County, Wisconsin
Republican Party members of the Wisconsin State Assembly
Mayors of places in Wisconsin
People of Wisconsin in the American Civil War
Union Army soldiers
19th-century American politicians